Hapoel Kfar Saba is a professional basketball club based in Kfar Saba in the Sharon region, Central District of Israel. The team plays in the Liga Artzit.

History

Hapoel Kfar Saba was founded in 1957 and played in the Liga Artzit (the third-tier division).

In 2009, Kfar Saba was merged with Elitzur Kohav Yair and since then playing in the Liga Leumit (the second-tier division).

In the 2016–17 season, Kfar Saba have reached the Liga Leumit Playoffs as the second seed but eventually lost to Hapoel Be'er Sheva in the Semifinals.

In the 2017–18 season, Kfar Saba have reached the Liga Leumit Playoffs as the eighth seed but eventually lost to Maccabi Kiryat Gat in the Quarterfinals.

In the 2018–19 season, Kfar Saba have been relegated to the Liga Artzit, the third tier of the Israeli Basketball.

Season by season

Notable players

References

External links
Facebook page 
Eurobasket page

Basketball teams in Israel
Sport in Kfar Saba
Basketball teams established in 1950
1950 establishments in Israel